Elf Aquitaine was a 62-foot waterline length catamaran that was sailed across the Atlantic ocean in 1981.

See also
 List of multihulls

References

Individual catamarans
1980s sailing yachts
Route du Rhum yachts